The Island Blossom is a Chesapeake Bay log canoe, built in 1892, by William Sidney Covington in Tilghman, Maryland. Double-ended, her bow is sharp with a straight, slightly raking stem and a longhead, and she has a sharp stern. The canoe is privately owned by the family John C. North II, descendants of Mr. Covington, and races under No. 9. She is one of the last 22 surviving traditional Chesapeake Bay log canoes, carrying on a tradition of racing on the Eastern Shore of Maryland that has existed since the 1840s. Skippered since 1999 by Corbin Penwell of St. Michaels, Maryland, Island Blossom has won a record 13 consecutive High Point trophies for the fleet's overall season winner, finishing first overall from 2009–2022 (the fleet skipped the 2020 season due to COVID-19). This streak topped the previous mark of six in a row originally set by Doug Hanks Sr., also aboard Blossom, between 1981-1986 and matched by Tyler Johnson on Persistence from 1998-2003 and Blossom under Penwell from 2009-2014. Island Blossom has won 16 High Point trophies overall since 2004. She is located at St. Michaels, Talbot County, Maryland.

She was listed on the National Register of Historic Places in 1985.

References

External links
, including photo in 1984, at Maryland Historical Trust

Ships in Talbot County, Maryland
Ships on the National Register of Historic Places in Maryland
National Register of Historic Places in Talbot County, Maryland